Heteropsis teratia is a butterfly in the family Nymphalidae. It is found in the Democratic Republic of the Congo, Kenya, Tanzania, Zambia and possibly Uganda.

References

Elymniini
Butterflies described in 1894
Butterflies of Africa